"Pyjamarama" is a song by English rock band Roxy Music, released as a single in March 1973, to promote their For Your Pleasure album, though it was excluded from the album itself. It reached a peak of #10 on the UK Singles Chart after a twelve week charting stint. The song was written by Bryan Ferry, and the first one he wrote with the guitar as his instrument. and was backed by an instrumental non-LP track called "The Pride and the Pain" written by Andrew Mackay.

In 1977, it was re-released as a single, together with "Virginia Plain", to promote their Greatest Hits album, and reached number 11. However the 1977 release was a different mix with less sax treatments on it and the closing guitar refrain edited differently from the original Island 7" version. The original version (along with "The Pride and the Pain") was re-released on the box set The Thrill of It All, while the 1977 version can be found on the Street Life: 20 Great Hits compilation. In 2012, both mixes were included in the ten-disc boxed set The Complete Studio Recordings 1972-1982 on the bonus compilation Singles, B-sides and Alternative Mixes.

A live version appears on Viva! Roxy Music.

Personnel
Bryan Ferry – vocals, guitar
Brian Eno – VCS3 synthesizer 
Andrew Mackay – saxophone 
Phil Manzanera – electric guitar
John Porter – bass guitar
Paul Thompson – drums

References

1973 singles
Roxy Music songs
Songs written by Bryan Ferry
Song recordings produced by Chris Thomas (record producer)
Island Records albums